Alfred or Alf Bennett may refer to:

Alfred Bennett (Australian politician) (1906–1976), Australian Labor Party member of the New South Wales Legislative Assembly
Alfred Bennett (broadcaster) (1889–1963), Australian broadcasting executive
Alfred H. Bennett (born 1965), American judge
Alfred J. Bennett (1861–1923), English artist
Alfred Rosling Bennett (1850–1928), British electrical engineer
Alfred S. Bennett (1854–1925), American judge
Alfred William Bennett (1833–1902), British botanist and publisher
Alf Bennett (1898–?), English footballer